Charles Lindy Waddell (May 13, 1932 – July 19, 2022) was an American politician who served for 26 years as a member of the Virginia Senate. He left the Senate to serve as deputy transportation secretary to Governor Jim Gilmore. At his retirement, he was chairman of the Senate transportation committee. Before serving as senator, Waddell served one term on the Loudoun County Board of Supervisors, representing the Broad Run District from 1968 to 1971.

In 1998 he married Jane Rankin Herring, the mother of future 33rd District Senator and Virginia Attorney General, Mark Herring. After Jane's death in 2017, he resided in Leesburg, Virginia. Waddell died on July 19, 2022, at the age of 90.

References

External links 
 
 

1932 births
2022 deaths
Democratic Party Virginia state senators
County supervisors in Virginia
20th-century American politicians
People from Sterling, Virginia